Shriek of the Mutilated (also known as Mutilated and Scream of the Snowbeast) is a 1974 American horror film directed by Michael Findlay, and starring Alan Brock, Jennifer Stock, and  Michael Harris. It follows a group of university students who, with their professor, visit a remote island in upstate New York to investigate sightings of a Yeti-like creature.

Plot
Professor Ernst Prell, an investigator of Yeti sightings, embarks on a field trip into the mountains with four graduate students: Keith Henshaw, Karen Hunter, Tom Nash and Lynn Kelly. The night before the trip, the professor invites Keith to dinner at a restaurant, where he samples an exotic dish named "gin sung." The rest of Dr. Prell's students attend an off-campus party where they encounter a former student, turned alcoholic groundskeeper, named Spencer St. Clair, who is there with his wife April. St. Clair proceeds to tell everyone within earshot the story of Prell's last Yeti-seeking field trip, which only he and the professor survived.

After the party, Spencer continues to drink, and upon returning home fights with his wife and cuts her throat with an electric carving knife. Afterwards, he climbs into the bathtub fully clothed. He is killed by his not quite dead wife, who drags a toaster into the bathroom and dumps it into the bath, electrocuting him.

In the morning, the professor travels by van with his students to Boot Island, where his friend Dr. Karl Werner lives. Werner has recently seen the Yeti on his island, and conjectures that he was marooned there by melting winter ice. He introduces the others to a mute Native American manservant named Laughing Crow. The group have dinner, which is again "gin sung," then go to sleep after one of the students, Tom, sings a song about the Yeti.

The next day, the professor and his students begin their search in the woods of the island. Tom sneaks off to go hunting and is killed by the Yeti. The rest of the group look for Tom the next morning. Karen finds only his rifle and his severed leg. Meanwhile, Lynn goes into Dr. Werner's greenhouse and sees something that frightens her; she runs into the woods and is also killed by the Yeti.

At the house, the remaining students find that the phone is out of order. The professor decides to use Tom's leg as bait to lure the Yeti into a trap. The plan fails, however, as Prell returns to the house claiming he was knocked down by the monster, who escapes with the leg in its jaws. Prell then decides to try again, using Lynn's body as bait. Karen tries to hide the body in the greenhouse, where she discovers the rest of Tom's body, and passes out. When she awakes, Dr. Prell tells her it must have been a dream as she was asleep for quite some time. Karen doesn't believe him, leading them all back to the greenhouse where they uncover Lynn's body.

Disgusted that Dr. Prell is going to use their friend's body as bait, Karen reluctantly agrees to help out by taking photos, under the condition that they leave Boot Island whether they succeed or fail. Both Dr. Prell and Keith agree, and Karl wishes them good luck.

The professor ties Lynn's body to a tree and the trap is set. The Yeti appears and Keith chases it into the woods. He tracks it by the sound of its heartbeat, but makes the discovery that the sound is actually coming from a speaker attached to a tree. Someone knocks him out with a branch.

Back at the house, Laughing Crow is shown listening to an LP record of the Yeti's heartbeat. It turns out that Dr. Prell and Werner are members of a cannibalistic cult, using the Yeti scam as a way to lure victims, and that the Yeti is actually Dr. Werner in disguise. While Karen is asleep upstairs, Keith returns to the house and discovers Dr. Prell and Dr. Werner discussing what to do with her. Werner thinks they should just kill her, but Prell says that the code calls for no body bruises and that she must be frightened to death. Keith pulls out a rifle and orders both men to put their hands up. They ignore him.

He shoots at them, finding out that the shells are blanks. He is then knocked unconscious by Laughing Crow. Still asleep upstairs, Karen wakes to a growling noise. She looks out the window and finds the Yeti running full speed at the house. Karen flees through the house and ends up trapped in a bathroom. She opens a cabinet to find Laughing Crow holding a knife, and dies of fright.

While setting up for their big breakfast, Keith wakes up and manages to sneak away. He tries to escape in the van, but it gets stuck in the mud while he tries to hide from the party guests' funeral procession. Keith then hoofs it down to the bridge where he manages to flag down a cop who takes him back to the house.

At the breakfast, Prell and Werner salute the party guests and hosts, toasting the previous schemes which have provided victims. Keith returns with the policeman, only to find out that he too is a cannibal. Prell and Werner explain that the "gin sung" Keith has eaten is actually human flesh, and they invite him to join their cannibalistic society. They bring in Karen's body, and Laughing Crow, brandishing an electric carving knife, speaks for the first time, saying "Mr. Henshaw — white meat or dark?"

Cast

Production

Development
The husband and wife directorial team Michael Findlay] and Roberta Findlay began collaborating on films together in the 1960s, directing, producing, and filming low-budget horror, exploitation, and pornographic films. Prior to Shriek of the Mutilated, Roberta had served as cinematographer on the horror film Invasion of the Blood Farmers (1972), directed by Ed Adlum.

Adlum co-wrote the screenplay for Shriek of the Mutilated with Ed Kelleher, and pitched the project to Michael Findlay, whom they hired as director. By Adlum'sa account, on the first day of shooting while completing the opening title sequence, Michael suffered a nervous breakdown; Adlum recalled in a 2008 interview:

Desperate to complete the film, Adlum contacted Roberta, who was, by her account, estranged from Michael at that point. She obliged Adlum's request to work on the film as cinematographer because the project had already been written, funded, and its actors cast.

Filming

Filming took place primarily in Westchester County, New York, in Croton-on-Hudson and  Yorktown. Some filming also took place in New York City: The film's opening campus sequences were shot on location at Fordham University in the Bronx; the campus's Keating Hall and Edwards Parade appear in the opening sequence of the film. The party sequence that appears early in the film was shot at an apartment in the city.

Release
After being rejected by American International Pictures, the film was acquired by American Films Ltd. It was given a limited theatrical release in the United States by American Films Ltd., opening at drive-in theaters in Brownsville, Texas on July 18, 1974, and in Florida on July 19, 1974. It opened at drive-ins in Fresno, Bakersfield, and Inyo, California on December 4, 1974 on a double bill with Moonchild (1974). The film continued to screen in various U.S. cities throughout 1976 and 1977.

The film continued to become a staple of late-night television in the years following its theatrical release.

Critical response

TV Guide called the film "one of the all-time worst, but the unintentional laughs may make it worth a look for those who can stomach inept filmmaking." On his website Fantastic Movie Musings and Ramblings, Dave Sindelar wrote, "Though it doesn’t quite reach the insane levels of Invasion of the Blood Farmers, it still earns its place in the annals of bad moviedom, and gets weirder as it goes along." James Jay Edwards from FilmFracture gave the film a positive review, writing, "Like most of the quickly produced true-life creature movies of the seventies, Shriek Of The Mutilated is very low-budget and looks every penny of it.  Still, it’s not without its charms, and for those who love a good laugh to go along with their shock, it’s essential viewing." 

Graeme Clark from The Spinning Image gave the film 3/10 stars, stating that the film was "good for trash fans with a sense of humour, but a no-go area for those with a low tolerance for shoddiness". The Terror Trap awarded the film 1.5 out of 4 stars, writing, "While it's true that some low budget drive in horrors are capable of generating some uniquely creepy vibes, unfortunately Shriek is an ineffectual cough that never rises to the occasion".

Home media
Iver Film Services (IFS) released the film on VHS in the United Kingdom in 1982. Lightning Video released a VHS in the United States in 1985. The film was released on DVD by Retromedia Entertainment in 2003. The DVD does not feature the "Popcorn" instrumental song that appears early in the film due to copyright issues.

Vinegar Syndrome released the film on Blu-ray on August 30, 2022, featuring several crew interviews, as well as an audio commentary with cinematographer Roberta Findlay.

Legacy
In 1977, Michael Findlay was killed in a helicopter accident. After her husband's death, Roberta went on to direct hardcore porn, and also kept adding to her horror filmography. Recently, some of their films have gained a cult following.

Writing of Shriek of the Mutilated in his book The Gorehound's Guide to Splatter Films of the 1960s and 1970s, Scott Aaron Stine lauded the film as "an innovative, well paced, and fun little shocker that belies the "talent" behind it."

See also
 List of American films of 1974

References

Sources

External links

1974 films
1974 horror films
1970s monster movies
American exploitation films
American independent films
American monster movies
American natural horror films
American slasher films
Backwoods slasher films
Films about cannibalism
Films about cults
Films based on urban legends
Films shot in New York (state)
Films shot in New York City
Mariticide in fiction
1970s English-language films
1970s American films